James Brown (born 4 June 1998) is an Irish professional footballer who plays for Doncaster Rovers, on loan from  club Blackburn Rovers as a right back.

Career
Brown began his career with Shelbourne, joining the senior team in April 2016. He signed for Drogheda United for the 2019 season. He won the 2020 League of Ireland First Division title with Drogheda, and was later selected for the 2021 PFAI Premier Division Team of the Year, as well as being Drogheda's Supporters' Player of the Year. He served as Drogheda's captain.

In late 2021, he underwent trials with English clubs Blackburn Rovers and Bristol Rovers. He signed a contract with Blackburn Rovers in January 2022. He made his EFL Championship debut for Blackburn on the final day of the 2021–22 season, starting in the club's 2–1 defeat of Birmingham City. On 29 July 2022, Brown signed for EFL League Two club Stockport County on loan for the 2022–23 season. He moved on loan to Doncaster Rovers in January 2023.

Style of play
Brown has been described as an "attack-minded full-back" who "is competent with both feet, can either cut inside or take the defender down to the byline in order to deliver a cross".

References

1998 births
Living people
Republic of Ireland association footballers
Shelbourne F.C. players
Drogheda United F.C. players
Blackburn Rovers F.C. players
Stockport County F.C. players
Doncaster Rovers F.C. players
League of Ireland players
English Football League players
Association football fullbacks
Republic of Ireland expatriate association footballers
Irish expatriate sportspeople in England
Expatriate footballers in England